Sole Survivor is a CBS Friday Night Movie directed by Paul Stanley and starring Richard Basehart, William Shatner, and Vince Edwards. The film, written by screenwriter Guerdon Trueblood, was first aired on television in 1970.

While the film follows the fate of the six-man crew of a B-25 Mitchell bomber, Sole Survivor is loosely based on the 1958 discovery of the B-24 Liberator bomber Lady Be Good in the Libyan desert. The Lady Be Good and her nine-man crew had disappeared without a trace in 1943, following its first and only combat mission in World War II. The bodies of eight of the crew were found in 1960.

Plot
While returning from a World War II bombing mission, a United States Army Air Forces B-25 Mitchell bomber sustains damage from action with German fighters. Without any order to abandon the aircraft, the navigator, Lieutenant Hamner (Richard Basehart), panics and bails out. Having no navigator, the remaining crew was now lost and overfly their base by 300 miles. 
The five remaining crewmen, believing they are still over water, bail out and survive their parachute landings, although one of the crew, Brandy (Dennis Cooney), is badly injured. Needing water and desert survival gear, one of the group, Tony (Lou Antonio), walks to the aircraft following the heading that would have been flown, hoping to find the aircraft and bring back much needed supplies. The aircraft had eventually crash landed in the Libyan desert.

Unfortunately, when Tony arrives at the bomber and crawls underneath the tail to escape the sun, the tail, which has been hanging precariously, breaks away, instantly crushing him. After several days beneath the relentless African sun, the remaining crewmen ultimately die of exposure. Their ghosts make their way back to the wreckage of the aircraft where they spend the next 17 years in a type of limbo state, playing baseball and longing for repatriation back to their home country, which can occur only if their bodies are recovered.

An oil surveying aircraft finally spots the wreckage, reporting the discovery back to the United States Air Force. Seeing the survey aircraft and realizing that they are soon about to "have visitors", the five remaining crew members' ghosts begin returning the aircraft to its state at the time of the crash, putting objects and artifacts in their original positions in hopes of convincing their visitors they had stayed with the aircraft and hopefully inducing them to search for their bodies.

Having survived the crash, Hamner, who had remained in the military after the war and is now an Air Force brigadier general, is asked by investigators Lieutenant Colonel Josef Gronke (William Shatner) and Major Michael Devlin (Vince Edwards) to accompany their team to the remains of the B-25. Fearing disciplinary action and the end of his military career should the truth of his cowardice be found out, he tries to convince Gronke and Devlin that the entire crew bailed out over the Mediterranean with him and that the pilotless aircraft somehow flew on by itself. Although the discovery of a harmonica belonging to crewman Gant (Lawrence P. Casey) indicates that the crew did not bail out over the sea, the bodies are nowhere to be seen.

Unable to find evidence to the contrary, the team has no choice but to accept Hamner's explanation, though Devlin is convinced that Hamner is lying, knowing firsthand the guilt over his own bad judgment when he crashed his military aircraft in California, killing some school children. Devlin confronts an inebriated Hamner, who finally admits his actions, although he points out that pilot Mac (Patrick Wayne) had turned down navigator Hamner's heading to a Nazi occupied landing point, and then believed that the others had probably (and "should have") bailed out rather than flying on in the damaged aircraft.

When Devlin returns to his tent, the ghosts of the crew make their appearance to Hamner, leading him to flee in panic across the desert in a jeep. Followed by the investigators, the chase ends with them arriving at the scene of an abandoned life raft (the crew having abandoned the aircraft in the darkness, convinced they were still over open water), revealing to the entire team what Hamner has already admitted to Devlin.

The heading to the life raft and an estimate of how long they could survive on foot helps the team find the missing bodies. The ghost of each crewman vanishes as their bodies are recovered, their spirits accompanying their remains back to the United States. Tony, however, had died under the tail of the aircraft and a solitary Tony remains at the aircraft. A glimmer of hope remains, as a diary is found near Mac's body, mentioning Tony's return to the aircraft. The team decides to make one final detailed search at the crash site.

Cast

 Vince Edwards as Maj Michael Devlin
 Richard Basehart as Brig General Russell Hamner
 William Shatner as Lt Col Josef Gronke
 Lou Antonio as Tony
 Lawrence P. Casey as Gant
 Dennis Cooney as Brandy
 Brad David as Elmo
 Patrick Wayne as Mac (credited as Pat Wayne)
 Alan Caillou as Corey
 Timur Bashtu as Beddo
 Noah Keen as MG Schurm
 Ian Abercrombie as British co-pilot
 David Cannon as Capt Patrick
 John Winston as British pilot
 Julie Bennett as Amanda
 Bart Burns as Older Senator
 Vin Scully as himself (voice of a Los Angeles Dodgers baseball game heard on radio)

Production
Sole Survivor was shot primarily on location in the El Mirage Dry Lake in the northwestern Victor Valley of the central Mojave Desert, within San Bernardino County, California. The shooting schedule involved a three-and-a-half-week period in May–June, 1969.

The aircraft that were used in the film were:
 Cessna 310
 North American TB-25JN Mitchell c/n 108-34254, s/n 44-30979
 Sikorsky H-19B c/n 551050, N860

Historical background
In 1943, the actual aircraft—Lady Be Good—failed to find its airbase near the African coast after a bombing raid on Naples. Instead the crew mistakenly flew on hundreds of miles into the desert. This was because the navigation system could not distinguish between a direct or reciprocal bearing contact. The same radio bearing would be returned whether the bomber was inbound or outbound from its base.
 
Eventually as the B-24's fuel ran out, the nine-man crew bailed out into the Libyan desert. The eight survivors tried to walk to safety; their remains were eventually found in 1960 some 80 to 100 miles north of the wreckage site. The aircraft broke into two pieces upon impact. When it was found in 1958 by an oil surveying team, the bomber's remains were well preserved with edible food and water still on board. Its machine guns and radio were also still in working order.

Reception
Sole Survivor aired on January 9, 1970, and was the first of made-for-TV movies broadcast on CBS, and produced by CBS-owned Cinema Center Films (the company's short-lived foray into feature film production). Sole Survivor was released in Region B/2 in a DVD/Blu-ray dual-disk set on March 14, 2016.

Film aviation historian Simon D. Beck in The Aircraft-Spotter's Film and Television Companion (2016) described Sole Survivor as "a tense, well-crafted story."

References

Notes

Citations

Bibliography

 Beck, Simon D. The Aircraft-Spotter's Film and Television Companion. Jefferson, North Carolina: McFarland and Company, 2016. .
 Farmer, James H. Broken Wings: Hollywood's Air Crashes. Missoula, Montana: Pictorial Histories Pub. Co., 1984. .
 McClendon, Dennis E. Lady Be Good, Mystery Bomber of World War II. Fallbrook, California: Aero Publishers, 1962. .

External links
 

1970 television films
1970 films
American aviation films
American World War II films
Films about the United States Army Air Forces
American ghost films
Films set in the 1940s
Films set in the 1950s
Films set in Libya
Films set in deserts
Films directed by Paul Stanley (director)
1970s English-language films
1970s American films